The Craiova is a right tributary of the river Cerna in Romania. It flows into the Cerna downstream from Cerna-Sat.

References

Rivers of Romania
Rivers of Caraș-Severin County